Série 2600, nicknamed Nez-Cassée ("broken nose"), is a type of 25 kV 50 Hz electric locomotive currently used by Portuguese Railways. They are closely based on the SNCF Class BB 15000 locomotive design. The locomotives were styled by Paul Arzens, designed by Groupement 50Hz (a French consortium led by Alsthom) and entered service in 1974. Of the 12 built, 9 were still in service in 2012. They have a top speed of 160 km/h.

Série 2620 is virtually identical to Série 2600. Nine locomotives were assembled in Portugal by Sorefame in 1987 (under licence from Groupement 50 Hz/Alsthom); as of 2012 seven remained in service.

The locomotives are less powerful than the newer Série 4700 and 5600 locomotives, sometimes leading to late running on services. As of 2011, CP Carga (the freight division of CP) was able to discontinue using the Série 2600 and 2620 locomotives. As of 2012, it was expected that the remaining locomotives would be withdrawn within the next few years. As of 2013 all had been withdrawn from service.

As part of a June 2019 government plan to reintroduce withdrawn rolling stock, it is expected that this series will re-enter service. In September 2019, a first 2600 locomotive was hauled to Contumil to be repaired, followed by four more in October.

Diagram

See also
 CP Class 1900
 CP Class 1930
 Netherlands Railways (NS) class 1600 - also derived from the French BB 15000 class
 SŽ series 363

References

Electric locomotives of Portugal
Railway locomotives introduced in 1974
Alstom locomotives